Landsting elections were held in Denmark on 11 April 1947, with the exceptions that the electors were elected on 1 April 1947, that the candidates elected by the resigning parliament were elected on 7 March, and that the Faroese member was elected by the Løgting on 26 March.

Of the seven constituencies the seats representing constituencies number one (Copenhagen), four (Odense and Svendborg County), six (Hjørring, Aalborg, Thisted, Viborg and Randers County) and seven (the Faroe Islands) were up for election.

John Christmas Møller attributed the decline of his party—the Conservative People's Party—to his position regarding Southern Schleswig and resigned as parliamentary group leader as a consequence.

Results

References

Elections in Denmark
Denmark
Landsting